PUJ may mean:

 IATA airport code for Punta Cana International Airport
 FAA LID code for Paulding County Regional Airport
 Public Utility Jeepney
 Pelvico ureteral junction or Ureteropelvic junction - Where the ureter connects to the renal pelvis

See also 
 PUI (disambiguation)
 Puy